Euromina is a locality in the upper Mid North of South Australia.

References

Towns in South Australia